The 1999 North Queensland Cowboys season was the 5th in the club's history. Coached by Tim Sheens and captained by Noel Goldthorpe, they competed in the National Rugby League.

Season summary 
Despite undergoing another roster clean-out in the off-season, the Cowboys endured a rough season. After starting the year with a bye, the club went on a five-game losing streak. One of the few positive periods of their season then followed, with a 24-0 win over the Auckland Warriors followed by a 20-20 draw with the Brisbane Broncos and a 20-14 win over the Balmain Tigers. The victory over the Warriors was the first time in club history that they had held a side scoreless. Following the win over Balmain in Round 9, the club won just two of their next 16 games.

The Round 25 victory over the Western Suburbs Magpies turned out to be the club's most important game of the season. Heading into the match, the Cowboys sat in 16th place, one point ahead of the bottom-placed Magpies. A loss would have more than likely seen them finish the year in last place.
In Round 26, the Cowboys played the North Sydney Bears in their final ever premiership appearance. The club finished the season in 16th with just four wins, their lowest win total since 1995.

One of the players brought to the club in 1999 was former-Cronulla Sharks halfback Paul Green. In June, Green became the first Cowboys' player to represent Queensland in State of Origin. In 2014, Green returned to the club as head coach, leading them to their maiden premiership victory in 2015.

Milestones 
 Round 2: Geoff Bell, Greg Bourke, Brett Boyd, Darrien Doherty, Jody Gall, Noel Goldthorpe, Paul Green, Brett Hetherington and Matthew Ryan made their debuts for the club.
 Round 3: Chad Halliday and Ben Rauter made their debuts for the club.
 Round 4: Peter Jones played his 50th game for the club.
 Round 4: Paul Dezolt made his NRL debut.
 Round 5: Damien Smith made his debut for the club.
 Round 7: The club held a team scoreless for the first time (def. Auckland, 24-0).
 Round 7: Brian Jellick made his NRL debut.
 Round 9: Adam Connelly made his NRL debut.
 Round 10: George Wilson made his debut for the club.
 Round 14: Scott Asimus and Shaun Valentine made their NRL debuts.
 Round 19: Kyle Warren played his 50th game for the club.
 Round 21: Glen Murphy played his 50th game for the club.
 Round 22: Leigh McWilliams made his NRL debut.
 Round 23: Mark Shipway played his 50th game for the club.
 Round 23: John Manning made his NRL debut.
 Round 24: Shane Muspratt made his NRL debut.
 Round 25: Nick Paterson made his NRL debut.
 Round 26: Craig Smith made his NRL debut.

Squad list

Squad movement

1999 Gains

1999 Losses

Ladder

Fixtures

Regular season

Statistics 

Source:

Representatives 
The following players played a representative match in 1999.

Honours

Club 
 Player of the Year: Paul Bowman
 Players' Player: John Buttigieg
 Club Person of the Year: Barry Buchanan

References 

North Queensland Cowboys seasons
North Queensland Cowboys